Hollywood Story is a 1951 American mystery film directed by William Castle and starring Richard Conte and Julie Adams. The supporting cast features Richard Egan, Henry Hull, Fred Clark and Jim Backus. 

The film was an attempt by Universal Pictures to take advantage of the success of Paramount's Sunset Boulevard which was released the previous year. Film historian Arthur Lyons stated that the plot is based on the murder of silent movie director William Desmond Taylor. While Hollywood Story reaches a fictional conclusion, it closely follows the circumstances of the real-life event.

On the film's release, Universal promoted the appearances in it of several once-famous silent screen celebrities. It came to light that those with speaking parts had received just $55 per shooting day. Others, like Elmo Lincoln, the first screen Tarzan, appeared as non-speaking extras and received only $15 per day.

Plot
New York theatrical producer Larry O'Brien (Conte) plans to found a motion picture company in Hollywood. He buys an old studio which has remained unused since the days of silent movies. There he's shown the office where a famous director was murdered twenty years earlier. Although there were many suspects the case hasn't been solved. O'Brien becomes fascinated by the subject and decides to make a film based on the case. To this end he begins interviewing the surviving participants, hiring many to work on and in the film, and soon gets into danger himself.

Cast

Production
Hollywood Story was the last film Castle made under his three-year contract with Universal. He shot many scenes at the old Charlie Chaplin studio to ensure it had the feel of old Hollywood. The movie led to Castle being offered a contract to return to Columbia.

Reception

Critical response
Film critic Bosley Crowther panned the film, blaming the script. He wrote, "It is easy to see, now, why some pictures which sound promising at the start, on the strength of the ideas behind them, turn out to be dismal flops.  Hollywood Story demonstrates it ... scriptwriters Frederick Kohner and Fred Brady have cooked up in the way of a plot—is a pretty routine assembly of simple who-dunnit cliches into a silly and not very startling disclosure of a motive for a crime. The police must have been awfully lazy back in 1929."

Film critic Dennis Schwartz generally liked the production and wrote about what might had motivated studio executives to produce it: "A fairly absorbing crime thriller whose plot involves a look at Hollywood's silent stars. The film tries to capitalize on the success of the similar themed silent film modern day venture Sunset Boulevard which was released in 1950 ... The climax makes for a hard to guess whodunit and a nice peek into the silent film era and at some silent stars who make a cameo appearance and speak a few lines, like Helen Gibson and Francis X. Bushman ... The only thing that failed to work smoothly into the twisty script by Fred Kohner and Fred Brady and the confident direction of William Castle, was the romance between Adams and Conte. They end up getting married at the film's conclusion in a vain attempt to make this dark story seem lighter."

References

External links
 
 
 
 
 

1951 films
1950s thriller films
American thriller films
American black-and-white films
Film noir
Films à clef
Films about filmmaking
Films about Hollywood, Los Angeles
Films directed by William Castle
Films set in Los Angeles
Films set in the 1920s
Universal Pictures films
1950s English-language films
1950s American films